SEC14-like protein 1 is a protein that in humans is encoded by the SEC14L1 gene.

The protein encoded by this gene belongs to the SEC14 cytosolic factor family. It has similarity to yeast SEC14 and to Japanese flying squid RALBP which suggests a possible role of the gene product in an intracellular transport system.

References

Further reading